The 1973 Brown Bears football team was an American football team that represented Brown University during the 1973 NCAA Division I football season. After seven years of last- or second-to-last-place finishes, Brown rose to fifth place in the Ivy League. 

In their first season under head coach John Anderson, the Bears compiled a 4–3–1 record and outscored opponents 183 to 163. B. Ball was the team captain. 

The Bears' 4–3 conference record placed fifth in the Ivy League standings, the team's best showing since 1964. They outscored Ivy opponents 163 to 143. 

Brown played its home games at Brown Stadium in Providence, Rhode Island.

Schedule

References

Brown
Brown Bears football seasons
Brown Bears football